Egilbert (or Engelbert) (died 1101), called of Rothenburg, was the Archbishop of Trier from 1079 until his death. He was a partisan of the Holy Roman Emperor Henry IV during the Investiture Controversy, and was rewarded in 1100 with the dignity of Archchancellor of Gaul.

He was involved in a dispute with Henry, Duke of Lower Lorraine.

Year of birth unknown
1101 deaths
Archbishops of Trier
11th-century Roman Catholic archbishops in the Holy Roman Empire